Bilateral relations between the Republic of India and Germany have been traditionally strong due to commercial, cultural and technological co-operation.

History

During World War I, India was a part of the British Crown. Consequently, the British Indian Army was ordered to contribute soldiers to the Allied war effort, including on the Western Front. Pro-independence activists within the colonial armies sought German assistance in procuring India's freedom, resulting in the Hindu–German Conspiracy during World War I. 
 
During World War II, the Allied war effort mobilized 2.5 million volunteer troops from British India. Subhas Chandra Bose, a prominent Indian independence activist, made a determined effort to obtain India's independence from Britain by seeking military assistance from the Axis powers. The Indische Legion was formed to serve as a liberation force for British-ruled India and was principally made up of British Indian prisoners of war and expatriates in Europe.

The newly formed Republic of India was one of the first nations to end the State of War with Germany after World War II and did not claim war reparations from Germany although 24,000 soldiers serving in the British Indian Army died in the campaign to fight Nazi Germany.

India maintained diplomatic relations with both West Germany and East Germany and supported their reunification in 1990.

Germany condemned India for liberating Goa from Portuguese rule in 1961 and supported Portugal's dictatorial regime under Salazar against India. Germany was critical of India for intervening in the 1971 Bangladesh Liberation War. Germany rejected India's 1998 nuclear tests with Chancellor Helmut Kohl saying: "This was the wrong decision for them to take; we do not accept that decision."

Bilateral relations

Official visits by German presidents and chancellors 
In 2008, German Chancellor Angela Merkel made an official visit to India that led to the signing of several agreements expanding bilateral co-operation in commerce, science, technology and defence.

In 2013, German Chancellor Angela Merkel led a German delegation which included German Federal Ministers of Transport, Building & Urban Development, Interior, Defence, Education & Research, Parliamentary State Secretary for Environment, Nature Conservation, and Nuclear safety; to the Second India-Germany Intergovernmental Consultations in New Delhi.

On 4 October 2015, German Chancellor Angela Merkel travelled to India for the Third Indo-German Inter-Governmental Consultations  accompanied by several members of her government (Minister for Foreign Affairs Frank-Walter Steinmeier, Science & Technology Minister Johanna Wanka, Minister for Economic Cooperation and Development Gerd Müller, Food and Agriculture Minister Christian Schmidt) and a contingent of business leaders. Merkel and her German delegation travelled on a German military cargo plane (a Luftwaffe Airbus A310 military transport aircraft called Kurt Schumacher) because the official government aircraft of the German Chancellor (Konrad Adenauer, a Luftwaffe Airbus A340-313 VIP) became unflightworthy after developing technical problems. The visit, announced by the German embassy in India as a turning point in Indo-German relations,

On 5 October 2015, Angela Merkel visited Mahatma Gandhi's memorial at Raj Ghat and was accorded a ceremonial welcome at the Presidential Palace prior to the Third Indo-German Inter-Governmental Consultations  which led to the signing of 18 Memorandums of Understanding (MoU). Germany returned a 10th-century relic, a statue of the Hindu goddess Durga in her Mahishasuramardini avatar, which had been stolen from India.

On 6 October 2015, Prime Minister Narendra Modi held trade discussions on Indo-German science, technology & education cooperation with Angela Merkel in Bengaluru, India's aerospace and ICT hub, besides exploring opportunities to improve bilateral trade. Merkel and Modi toured the vocational training facilities and innovation centre of Robert Bosch. Bosch entered India in 1922, when Illies & Company set up a sales office in Calcutta. Currently, Bosch India has a turnover of over $3 billion and over 31,000 employees spread across 10 locations and 7 application development centers. 84% of Bosch India revenues come from its automotive business, with the remaining 16% split between its non-automotive businesses that include packaging, energy and building solutions, power tools and consumer retail Bosch India is listed on the Indian stock exchanges and has a market capitalization of over $12 billion. Angela Merkel's 3-day official visit to India concluded after the two leaders attended a business & technology forum hosted by NASSCOM and Fraunhofer Society where Merkel said: "India needs jobs, Germany needs people and collaboration is crucial to meet the demographic needs of both countries", and opined that the advantages for German companies in India are its huge market, a great growth potential and an impressive capacity for innovation.

Foremost newspapers in both Germany and India focussed primarily on the trade and investment aspects of the visit. Germany's State broadcaster Deutsche Welle eloquently captured the prevailing mood regarding the visit with its editorial titled:"A first step in the right direction – no more, no less". Indian Express in an editorial titled "She came and went" pondered over the modest nature of agreements announced during the visit and placed the onus on India to raise its attractiveness as a partner through concrete socio-economic progress and improvements in bilateral relations in India's immediate neighbourhood. The Hindu termed the visit as a dosis realitaet reality-check for Merkel and Modi.

German Chancellor Olaf Scholz visited India on 25 February 2023. In a joint statement, both countries agreed to enhance their cooperation on innovation and technology. In May 2022 both countries agreed to work on development projects in third-world countries (Triangular Development Cooperation).

Strategic ties 

The India-Germany strategic relationship is limited by the insignificance of German geopolitical influence in Asian affairs. Contrary to France and the UK, Germany has no strategic footprint in Asia.

Over the past decade, Indo-German trade grew in volume but dropped in importance. According to Indian Ministry of Commerce MX data: Total trade between India and Germany was $5.5 billion (3.8% share of Indian trade and ranked 6) in 2004 and $21.6 billion (2.6% share of Indian trade and ranked 9) in 2013. Indian exports to Germany were $2.54 billion (3.99% ranked 6) in 2004 and $7.3 billion (2.41% ranked 10) in 2013.
Indian imports from Germany were $2.92 billion (3.73% ranked 6) in 2004 and $14.33 billion (2.92% ranked 10) in 2013.

Global geopolitical reordering
India and Germany both seek to become permanent members of the United Nations Security Council and have joined with Japan and Brazil to coordinate their efforts via the G4 collective. At the UN General Assembly summit in New York in September 2015, the P5 members of the UNSC dismissed any notion of dilution of their power at the UN's high-table and severely undermined efforts by G4 nations to gain access to the exclusive club. While India maintains that it will continue to demand a permanent seat with veto powers within a reformed UNSC with privileges identical to the P5 nations, it has signalled that strengthening of bilateral economic and political ties with neighbouring countries is the immediate priority. Prevailing consensus within the United Nations that Europe is already over-represented within the UN Security Council, juxtaposed with long-established opposition from within Europe to the German candidature, constitute indomitable obstacles which confront Germany.

A reality-check of geopolitical power of G4 nations at the 2015 UN General Assembly and Asian geopolitical compulsions have influenced India's choice to refocus on strategic bilateral engagements with France and UK who are UNSC P5 member States. Treaty on the Final Settlement concerning Germany placed restrictions on German armed forces at total strength of 375,000. But it is to be noted that restrictions on German armed forces are no longer valid because they only came into effect after the treaty of conventional weapons in Europe and Russia has suspended that treaty and is no longer adhering to it, thus giving other countries fair excuse to withdraw from it as well And it is to be noted No west European armed forces (including Uk, France and Germany) has armed forces more than 300000 in strength showing lack of political will in all of Europe (including Uk and France as well) to spend too much on defense.

Defence and security 

India and Germany maintain an ongoing dialogue in the areas of commercial maritime security and cooperation in the field of anti-terrorism. The Indian Navy and the German Navy conducted joint-exercises in 2008 for the first time, following an anti-piracy co-operation agreement between the two nations signed in 2006.

Germany's military is principally structured to defend Eastern Europe and to supporting NATO operations in the Western European theatre of operations. Unlike UK and France, Germany not only does not have any sovereign territories in the Indo-Pacific region but is also incapable of power projection.

Hostile public sentiment in Germany towards overseas combat operations and the inability of Germany to independently sustain high-intensity long-range military deployments are obstacles to a meaningful strategic defense and security relationship.

Cultural and educational cooperation 
Germany has supported education and cultural programmes in India. Germany helped establish the Indian Institute of Technology Madras after both governments signed an agreement in 1956 and increased its co-operation and supply of technology and resources over the decades to help expand the institution.

In the late 1960s, German aircraft designer Kurt Tank, who worked for Focke-Wulf during World War II, went to work in India. Kurt was first employed as the Director of the Madras Institute of Technology, and later joined Hindustan Aeronautics, where he designed the Hindustan Marut fighter-bomber, the first military aircraft constructed in India. Kurt Tank left Hindustan Aeronautics in 1967 and by the 1970s had returned to live in Berlin.

Both nations established the Indo-German Science and Technology Centre in New Delhi to promote joint research and development in energy, environment, coal and water technologies.

India and Germany have signed a MoU regarding the teaching of German language in Kendriya Vidyalaya public schools in India and the reciprocal introduction of Sanskrit and modern Indian language in government schools in Germany.

Starting from 1999, several German educational institutions have relied on satellite launch services provided by ISRO. DLR-Tubsat, BIRD, Rubin-8, Compass-1, Rubin-9A, Rubin-9B, BeeSat, UWE-2 & AISAT were all successfully launched using the Polar Satellite Launch Vehicle.

Trade and investment 

Stiff competition between foreign manufactured goods within the Indian market has seen machine-tools, automotive parts and medical supplies from German Mittelstand ceding ground to high-technology imports manufactured by companies located in ASEAN & BRICS countries.

For the 2012-2013 (April–July) period, India's top 10 trading partners according to data published by the Indian Ministry of Commerce:

According to German Statistisches Bundesamt Indo-German trade data for 2014 : total trade with India was €15.98 billion (ranked 25) with €1.86 billion trade balance in Germany's favour. German exports to India was €8.92 billion (ranked 25), German imports from India was €7.06 billion (ranked 27).

Germany is India's largest trading partner in Europe. Germany is the 8th largest foreign direct investor (FDI) in India. Germany's FDI totaled about US$5.2 billion during the period 2000–2012, constituting about 3% of total FDI to India. Indian investments in Germany have seen sharp increase in last few years. (Note: As a measure of comparison, Remittances to India by the Indian diaspora worldwide was US$70 billion in 2013–14).

Indian Prime-Minister Narendra Modi jointly opened the Hannover trade fair Hannover Messe 2015 on 12 April 2015 along with Angela Merkel  and held trade & investment discussions with German Chancellor Angela Merkel in Berlin.

In September 2015, Automotive Research Association of India (ARAI) was instructed by the Indian government to investigate if vehicles from Volkswagen had circumvented Indian laws and regulations on vehicle emission testing following the Volkswagen emissions scandal. Ambuj Sharma, additional secretary at the Ministry of Heavy Industry, said: "ARAI has been asked to submit its report within a week."

Bilateral trade
German imports from India amounted to $9.51 billion or 2.26% of India's overall exports in 2021. The 10 major commodities exported from India to Germany were:

Machinery, nuclear reactors, boilers: $1.31 billion
Electrical, electronic equipment: $913.61 million
Organic chemicals: $833.80 million
Articles of apparel, knit or crocheted: $547.51 million
Vehicles other than railway, tramway: $498.97 million
Articles of iron or steel: $429.93 million
Articles of apparel, not knit or crocheted: $351.58 million
Pharmaceutical products: $316.05 million
Rubbers: $310.42 million
Articles of leather, animal gut, harness, travel good: $281.66 million

German exports to India amounted to $13.3 billion or 2.17% of India's overall imports in 2019. The 10 major commodities exported from Germany to India were:

 Machinery, nuclear reactors, boilers: $3.75 billion
 Aircraft, spacecraft: $2.20 billion
 Electrical, electronic equipment: $1.51 billion
 Optical, photo, technical, medical apparatus: $1.22 billion
 Plastics: $635.46 million
 Organic chemicals: $590.91 million
 Vehicles other than railway, tramway: $513.42 million
 Miscellaneous chemical products: $469.05 million
 Iron and steel: $346.54 million
 Pharmaceutical products: $329.49 million

Perceptions

General public 

India suffers from a severe image deficit in Germany.

In August 2007, a mob of over 50 persons attacked 8 Indians in Mügeln.

In March 2015, Professor Annette Beck-Sickinger, the head of the biochemistry department at Leipzig University, caused a furore in India by rejecting an internship application from an Indian student as a retaliation against India's 'culture of rape' and alluding to the existence of a wider Europe-wide boycott of Indian male students. The racial profiling, gender discrimination and xenophobic undertones of the incident placed the spotlight on prevalent institutional bias, increasing intolerance to foreigners and level of respect for the human rights of persons of color in Germany. Indians have been deeply critical of the German institutional approach to the 2015 Leipzig University internship affair and the absence of sanctions against professor Annette Beck-Sickinger. The Leipzig University internship controversy, occurred just weeks before the April 2015 official visit to Germany by Indian Prime-Minister Narendra Modi at the invitation of German Chancellor Angela Merkel.

BBC World Service Country Rating Poll data for Germany and India

According to a 2014 BBC World Service Poll, 32% of Indians view Germany's influence positively, 42% neutral and 26% expressing a negative view, while only 16% of Germans view India's influence positively, 16% neutral and 68% expressing a negative view. Both countries view of each other is at the lower end of the poll charts by the BBC.

Embassies
The German embassy in India is located in New Delhi. The embassy of India in Germany is located at Berlin.

See also
 India–European Union relations
 Hindu–German Conspiracy
 Indians in Germany
 Germans in India
 Indian Ambassadors to the Federal Republic of Germany

References 

 
India 
Bilateral relations of India